Victoria Ivashina (/e-'va-she-na/) is a Russian-American economist and Lovett-Learned Professor of Finance at Harvard Business School, where she has taught since 2006.  She is a research associate at the National Bureau of Economic Research (NBER) and a research fellow at the Center for Economic Policy Research (CEPR).

Early life and education 
Ivashina was born in Kazakhstan, and was raised in Russia. She moved often within Russia, and attended six high schools. Ivashina pursued university studies in Peru, where her parents were working, and learned Spanish while completing her bachelor's degree. Ivashina holds a B.A. in economics from the Pontifical Catholic University of Peru and obtained a Ph.D. in finance from the NYU Stern School of Business.

Career 
Ivashina has taught at Harvard Business School since 2006, where she is Lovett-Learned Professor of Finance. She is a research associate at the National Bureau of Economic Research (NBER) and a research fellow at the Center for Economic Policy Research (CEPR).

Key publications 
Gompers, Paul A., Victoria Ivashina, and Richard S. Ruback. Private Equity: A Casebook. London: Anthem Press, 2019. 

Ivashina, Victoria, and Josh Lerner. Patient Capital: The Challenges and Promises of Long-Term Investing. First ed. Princeton, NJ: Princeton University Press, 2019.

References 

Year of birth missing (living people)
Living people
New York University Stern School of Business alumni
Russian expatriates in Peru
Pontifical Catholic University of Peru alumni
American women economists
21st-century American economists
Russian emigrants to the United States
Harvard Business School faculty
21st-century American women